Tobago Channel 5 is a community television station originating from the island of Tobago in Trinidad and Tobago. The station primarily broadcasts programming on Tobago, Tobago's news, Tobago's people, Tobago's culture and Tobago's perspective on national issues.

Tobago Channel 5 is one of two local television station in Tobago the other being the Tobago Inspirational Network (TIN). Its studios are located at 65-67 Lambeau, Signal Hill Road, Signal Hill, Tobago, Trinidad and Tobago. The station is carried on channel 5 on Trico Industries Limited and a live stream of their programmes is available on their website. Tobago Channel 5's original programming include programs such as Campout, Channel 5 News, Rise & Shine, Total Lockdown, Sports Talk, Half Time Show, Your Point Of View, High 5 and Jamboree.

Website
Tobago Channel 5 officially launched its website on July 1, 2009. The website provides a live stream of the station's programming and has information on Tobago's news and current affairs.

Personalities
 Ayana Carter - Channel 5 News
 Brother B - Rise and Shine
 Christo Gift (SC) - Hi 5 Reloaded
 Gerry McFarlane - Spot On

Network Slogans
 Building a stronger community, ...strengthening our nation (2002–present)

References

External links
 Facebook Page
Official Site
 Live Stream
 Trico Industries Limited (Under Construction)

Television stations in Trinidad and Tobago
Television channels and stations established in 2001